Ahmed Ali Qasem Al-Dhrab (born 1 October 1961) is a Yemeni former footballer and manager who manages the Yemen national team.

Playing career
During his playing career, Qasem played for hometown club Shaab Ibb.

Managerial career
In 2003, Qasem managed Yemen for a total of nine games. From 2014 to 2015, Qasem managed the Yemen under-19 team. Between January and April 2016, Qasem managed Yemen.

Domestically, Qasem managed Shaab Ibb, Al-Ittihad SCC, Najm Saba, Al Rasheed Ta'izz, Al-Shaab Hadramaut and Al-Oruba.

In May 2021, Qasem was re-appointed as manager of Yemen for a third time.

References

Living people
1961 births
People from Ibb Governorate
Association football goalkeepers
Yemeni football managers
Yemen national football team managers
Yemeni footballers